Maré Island or Nengone is the second-largest of the Loyalty Islands, in the archipelago of New Caledonia, an overseas territory of France in the Pacific Ocean. The island is part of the commune (municipality) of Maré, in the Loyalty Islands Province of New Caledonia.

Geography

It lies northeast of Grande Terre, New Caledonia's mainland. Like its neighbor to the north Lifou, Maré is a raised coral atoll, a former atoll that has been lifted about 120 meters. The interior of the island is the former lagoon, surrounded by a rim of higher land that was the ring of reef islets. Its fossil coral rock is honeycombed with caves, pools, and pits of all sizes, whose sharp edges make for difficult walking. Because of the lifting, the current shoreline is relatively recent and supports only short sections of nearshore fringing reef, unlike the extensive barrier reef found on the main island of New Caledonia, Grande Terre. The narrow beaches of Maré are often backed by cliffs.

Villages include, from north-southwards, Roh, Thogone, Kaewatine, Tenane, Hnawayaca, Wakuaori, Menaku, Padawa, Kaewaura, Pakada, Atha, Tadurehmu, Nece, La Roche, Tuo, Miramas, Wakone, Hanadid, Rawa, Tawainedr, Mebuet, Tadine, Cuaden, Cengeite, Penelo, Patho, Wabao, Medu, Kurin, and Eni.

Climate

Maré Island has a tropical monsoon climate (Köppen climate classification Am).

Commune
The commune of Maré is made up of Maré Island and the much smaller Dudune Island, which lie among the Loyalty Islands, to the northeast of New Caledonia's mainland. The settlement of Tadin, on Maré Island, is the administrative centre of the commune of Maré.

People
The population of Maré is about 6,900, of mainly Melanesian heritage (less than 2% of the population is of European ancestry). The indigenous language is Nengone, one of the Austronesian languages, widely spoken in island regions from Madagascar to Indonesia, coastal New Guinea and on most Pacific islands. There are two small towns of Tadine and La Roche, but most Maréans live in tribes associated with one of 29 chieftaincies (chefferie), that are closed to outsiders. Maréans are often fervent Christians, following extensive missionary activity by the competing Protestant (London Missionary Society) and Catholic (Marist)churches during the late 19th century. Sectarian hostility has led to episodic intertribal violence over the years.

Maré has produced several important leaders of the militant Front de Libération Nationale Kanak Socialiste (Kanak Socialist National Liberation Front, or FLNKS), which seeks independence from France. The Front was founded by a former grand chief of Maré, Nidoish Naisseline around 1970. Another Maréan, Yeiwene Yeiwene, was deputy to the Front's leader Jean-Marie Tjibaou during the violence of the early 1980s and the signing of the Matignon Accords on 26 June 1988 that brought peace. Seen as traitors by militant elements of the FLNKS, Tjibaou and Yeiwene were assassinated on the island of Ouvea on 4 May 1989. The gravesite of Yeiwene by the sea near Tadine on the west coast of Maré is maintained with often-renewed flower garlands.

European sighting
The first recorded sighting of Maré Island by a European occurred around August 1793. William Raven, master of Britannia was sailing to Batavia from Sydney, to procure provisions for the penal colony there.

Citations

External links

Communes of New Caledonia
Islands of New Caledonia
Loyalty Islands